Listed below are the dates and results for the 1998 FIFA World Cup qualification rounds for the European zone (UEFA).

A total of 50 UEFA teams entered the competition; Andorra, which joined FIFA and UEFA in November 1996 while the qualifiers were underway, could not enter. The European zone was allocated 15 places (out of 32) in the final tournament. France, the hosts, qualified automatically, leaving 14 spots open for competition between 49 teams.

The 49 teams were divided into nine groups, four groups of six teams and five groups of five teams. The teams would play against each other on a home-and-away basis. The group winners would qualify. The runners-up would be ranked according to their records against the 1st, 3rd and 4th-placed team in their groups, and the team with the best record would also qualify. The other runners-up would advance to the UEFA Play-offs.

In the play-offs, the 8 teams were paired up to play knockout matches on a home-and-away basis. The winners would qualify.

First round
First round was group play. The draw was made on 12 December 1995, and was based on the November 1995 FIFA World Rankings.

Seeding
The teams were divided into five pools as shown in table below (November 1995 rankings shown in brackets). Teams in bold eventually qualified for the final tournament, teams in bold italic qualified for the final tournament through the play-offs, and teams in italic participated in the play-offs but did not qualify for the final tournament.

Summary

Group 1

Group 2

Group 3

Group 4

Group 5

Group 6

Group 7

Group 8

Group 9

Ranking of second-placed teams
Record against the 1st, 3rd and 4th-placed team in their groups.

Second round

|}

Qualified teams
The following 15 teams from UEFA qualified for the final tournament.

1 Bold indicates champions for that year. Italic indicates hosts for that year.
2 Competed as West Germany. A separate team for East Germany also participated in qualifications during this time, having only competed in 1974.
3 Competed as Yugoslavia.

Goalscorers
There were 667 goals scored in 228 matches, for an average of 2.93 goals per match.
14 goals

 Predrag Mijatović

9 goals

 Savo Milošević

8 goals

 Gheorghe Popescu
 Hakan Şükür

7 goals

 Toni Polster
 Tony Cascarino
 Dennis Bergkamp
 Kennet Andersson
 Dejan Savićević

6 goals

 Luís Oliveira
 Emil Kostadinov
 Oliver Bierhoff
 Viorel Moldovan
 Kevin Gallacher

5 goals

 Lorenzo Staelens
 Davor Šuker
 Alan Shearer
 Antti Sumiala
 Ulf Kirsten
 Gheorghe Hagi
 Alfonso Pérez
 Oktay Derelioğlu
 Dean Saunders

4 goals

 Peter Stöger
 Luc Nilis
 Elvir Bolić
 Krasimir Balakov
 Alen Bokšić
 Vladimír Šmicer
 Brian Laudrup
 David Connolly
 Mitko Stojkovski
 Frank de Boer
 Pierre van Hooijdonk
 Ståle Solbakken
 Dorinel Munteanu
 Dan Petrescu
 Dušan Tittel
 Luis Enrique
 Fernando Hierro
 Kubilay Türkyilmaz
 Andriy Shevchenko
 Mark Hughes

3 goals

 Éric Assadourian
 Andreas Herzog
 Slaven Bilić
 Zvonimir Boban
 Siniša Gogić
 Allan Nielsen
 Teddy Sheringham
 Todi Jónsson
 Jari Litmanen
 Shota Arveladze
 Thomas Häßler
 Jürgen Klinsmann
 Demis Nikolaidis
 Eli Ohana
 Fabrizio Ravanelli
 Edgaras Jankauskas
 Dejvi Glavevski
 Gjorgji Hristov
 Iain Dowie
 Tore André Flo
 Kjetil Rekdal
 Ole Gunnar Solskjær
 Andrzej Juskowiak
 Luís Figo
 Gheorghe Craioveanu
 Constantin Gâlcă
 Igor Kolyvanov
 Peter Dubovský
 Tibor Jančula
 Jozef Majoroš
 Primož Gliha
 Julen Guerrero
 Martin Dahlin
 Pär Zetterberg
 Serhii Rebrov
 Andy Melville

2 goals

 Bledar Kola
 Uladzimir Makowski
 Émile Mpenza
 Eric Van Meir
 Hasan Salihamidžić
 Goran Vlaović
 Yiannos Iouannou
 Nikodimos Papavasiliou
 Radek Bejbl
 Pavel Kuka
 Patrik Berger
 Miklos Molnar
 Paul Gascoigne
 Ian Wright
 Uni Arge
 Jan Allan Müller
 Temuri Ketsbaia
 Béla Illés
 László Klausz
 Elek Nyilas
 Arnór Guðjohnsen
 Tryggvi Guðmundsson
 Brynjar Björn Gunnarsson
 Roy Keane
 Niall Quinn
 Tal Banin
 Itzik Zohar
 Pierluigi Casiraghi
 Paolo Maldini
 Christian Vieri
 Gianfranco Zola
 Vits Rimkus
 Jurijs Ševļakovs
 Mihails Zemļinskis
 Orestas Buitkus
 Saša Ćirić
 Miroslav Gjokić
 Toni Micevski
 Ronald de Boer
 Wim Jonk
 Patrick Kluivert
 Petter Rudi
 Pedro Barbosa
 João Vieira Pinto
 Dmitri Alenichev
 Vladimir Beschastnykh
 Yuriy Nikiforov
 Igor Simutenkov
 David Hopkin
 Július Šimon
 Zlatko Zahovič
 Guillermo Amor
 Pep Guardiola
 Juan Antonio Pizzi
 Stéphane Chapuisat
 Murat Yakin
 Arif Erdem
 Yuriy Maksymov
 Ryan Giggs
 Mark Pembridge
 Slaviša Jokanović
 Vladimir Jugović
 Siniša Mihajlović
 Dragan Stojković

1 goal

 Bajram Franholli
 Altin Haxhi
 Igli Tare
 Rudi Vata
 Garnik Avalyan
 Karapet Mikaelyan
 Artur Petrosyan
 Hakob Ter-Petrosyan
 Harutyun Vardanyan
 Andreas Heraf
 Heimo Pfeifenberger
 Ivica Vastić
 Vyacheslav Lychkin
 Vidadi Rzayev
 Nazim Suleymanov
 Valyantsin Byalkevich
 Sergei Gurenko
 Petr Kachuro
 Gert Claessens
 Bertrand Crasson
 Marc Degryse
 Gert Verheyen
 Marc Wilmots
 Meho Kodro
 Edin Mujčin
 Daniel Borimirov
 Ilia Gruev
 Ilian Iliev
 Trifon Ivanov
 Yordan Lechkov
 Luboslav Penev
 Hristo Stoichkov
 Ivaylo Yordanov
 Silvio Marić
 Robert Prosinečki
 Zvonimir Soldo
 Ioannis Okkas
 Charalambos Pittas
 Milenko Špoljarić
 Martin Frýdek
 Luboš Kozel
 Luboš Kubík
 Pavel Nedvěd
 Jiří Novotný
 Horst Siegl
 Michael Laudrup
 Per Pedersen
 Marc Rieper
 Michael Schjønberg
 Nick Barmby
 Les Ferdinand
 Paul Scholes
 Sergei Hohlov-Simson
 Marko Kristal
 Andres Oper
 Indrek Zelinski
 Jens Kristian Hansen
 Øssur Hansen
 John Petersen
 Joonas Kolkka
 Mika-Matti Paatelainen
 Jari Vanhala
 Georgi Kinkladze
 Kakhaber Tskhadadze
 Mario Basler
 Fredi Bobić
 Thomas Helmer
 Stefan Kuntz
 Olaf Marschall
 Andreas Möller
 Alekos Alexandris
 Stratos Apostolakis
 Giorgos Donis
 Kostas Frantzeskos
 Kostas Konstantinidis
 Daniel Batista Lima
 Nikos Machlas
 Marinos Ouzounidis
 Gábor Halmai
 Zoltán Kovács
 Ferenc Orosz
 Flórián Urbán
 Einar Daníelsson
 Bjarni Guðjónsson
 Þórður Guðjónsson
 Sigurður Jónsson
 Helgi Sigurðsson
 Ian Harte
 Ray Houghton
 Denis Irwin
 David Kelly
 Mark Kennedy
 Jason McAteer
 Alan McLoughlin
 Keith O'Neill
 Andy Townsend
 Gadi Brumer
 Ronen Harazi
 Roberto Baggio
 Roberto Di Matteo
 Vitālijs Astafjevs
 Vladimirs Babičevs
 Aleksandrs Jelisejevs
 Mario Frick
 Franz Schädler
 Harry Zech
 Valdas Ivanauskas
 Arminas Narbekovas
 Aidas Preikšaitis
 Tomas Ražanauskas
 Vaidotas Šlekys
 Tomas Žiukas
 Paolo Amodio
 Robby Langers
 Boban Babunski
 Nedžmedin Memedi
 Vančo Micevski
 Sašo Miloševski
 Artim Šakiri
 Srgjan Zaharievski
 Gilbert Agius
 Stefan Sultana
 Serghei Cleşcenco
 Alexandru Curtianu
 John Bosman
 Phillip Cocu
 Clarence Seedorf
 Jaap Stam
 Aron Winter
 Michael Hughes
 Neil Lennon
 Gerry Taggart
 Dan Eggen
 Jostein Flo
 Jahn Ivar Jakobsen
 Øyvind Leonhardsen
 Frank Strandli
 Egil Østenstad
 Henryk Bałuszyński
 Krzysztof Bukalski
 Marek Citko
 Adam Ledwoń
 Krzysztof Nowak
 Mirosław Trzeciak
 Krzysztof Warzycha
 Sérgio Conceição
 Rui Costa
 Fernando Couto
 Hélder Cristóvão
 Domingos Paciência
 Constantin Barbu
 Anton Doboş
 Ilie Dumitrescu
 Adrian Ilie
 Sergey Grishin
 Andrei Kanchelskis
 Valeri Karpin
 Valery Kechinov
 Alexei Kosolapov
 Vladislav Radimov
 Andrey Tikhonov
 Sergei Yuran
 Tom Boyd
 John Collins
 Gordon Durie
 Darren Jackson
 John McGinlay
 Ľubomír Moravčík
 Jaroslav Timko
 Marian Zeman
 Kiko
 Oli
 Raúl
 Patrik Andersson
 Mattias Jonson
 Henrik Larsson
 Adrian Kunz
 Massimo Lombardo
 Ciriaco Sforza
 Saffet Ayküz
 Oğuz Çetin
 Hami Mandirali
 Ertuğrul Sağlam
 Sergen Yalçın
 Vitaly Kosovsky
 Serhiy Popov
 Nathan Blake
 John Robinson
 Robbie Savage
 Gary Speed
 Branko Brnović
 Miroslav Đukić
 Zoran Mirković

1 own goal

 Dražen Ladić (playing against Bosnia & Herzegovina)
 Janek Meet (playing against Scotland)
 Marek Lemsalu (playing against Latvia)
 Óli Johannesen (playing against Spain)
 Teuvo Moilanen (playing against Hungary)
 Jurgen Kohler (playing against Albania)
 Theodoros Zagorakis (playing against Denmark)
 Fabio Cannavaro (playing against Russia)
 Luca Gobbi (playing against Turkey)

Notes
To date, this was the last time that Portugal failed to qualify for a FIFA World Cup.

References

External links 
 UEFA Qualifier results with full game box scores at Scoreshelf.com

  
UEFA
FIFA World Cup qualification (UEFA)
World Cup
World Cup